The Smithfield Road Historic District is a rural historic district in North Smithfield, Rhode Island, along Old Smithfield Road (Rhode Island Route 146A). It extends along Old Smithfield Road north from its junction with Sayles Hill Road, and is roughly bisected by Spring Brook. It includes eight historic houses or farmsteads, two 19th-century cemeteries, and a dam (whose construction date is unknown) on Spring Brook just east of the road. The district encompasses a cross-section of the development of agricultural properties in North Smithfield over the 19th century, with properties dating from 1811 (1034 Old Smithfield Road) to 1932 (1172 Old Smithfield Road).

The district was listed on the National Register of Historic Places in 1987.

See also 
 National Register of Historic Places listings in Providence County, Rhode Island

References

Walter Nebiker, The History of North Smithfield (Somersworth, NH: New England History Press, 1976).

Historic districts in Providence County, Rhode Island
North Smithfield, Rhode Island
Historic districts on the National Register of Historic Places in Rhode Island
National Register of Historic Places in Providence County, Rhode Island